Schrankia calligrapha is a species of moth of the family Erebidae first described by Snellen in 1880. It is found on Sulawesi and the New Hebrides.

References

Moths described in 1880
Hypenodinae